Aegean Airlines S.A. (Aeroporía Aigaíou , legal name ) is the flag carrier airline of Greece and the largest Greek airline by total number of passengers carried, by number of destinations served and by fleet size. A Star Alliance member since June 2010, it operates scheduled and charter services from Athens and Thessaloniki to other major Greek destinations as well as to a number of European and Middle Eastern destinations. Its main hubs are Athens International Airport in Athens, Macedonia International Airport in Thessaloniki and Larnaca International Airport in Cyprus. It also uses other Greek airports as bases, some of which are seasonal. It has its head office in Kifisia, a suburb of Athens.

On 21 October 2012, Aegean Airlines announced that it had struck a deal to acquire Olympic Air, and the buyout was approved by the European Commission a year later, on 9 October 2013. Both carriers continue to operate under separate brands. In addition, Aegean Airlines participated in the final stages of the tender for the privatization of Cyprus Airways, the national carrier of Cyprus. Following the bankruptcy of Cyprus Airways, Aegean Airlines established a hub at Larnaca Airport, thus initiating scheduled flights to and from the island to various destinations and filling the service gap created by the services termination of Cyprus Airways.

History

Beginnings
The company was founded in 1995, taking over activities from Aegean Aviation. It commenced VIP flights from Athens all over the world with wholly owned Learjet aircraft.

Commercial flights
Aegean's first commercial flights were in May 1999 from Athens to Heraklion, Crete and Thessaloniki with 2 new wholly owned British Aerospace Avro RJ100. In December 1999 Aegean acquired Air Greece. Since 2005, the airline has been in partnership with Lufthansa. In March 2006, Aegean Airlines also entered into a co-operation agreement with TAP Air Portugal. In December 2008, Aegean Airlines announced its co-operation with Brussels Airlines.

Cooperation
In 2009, Aegean Airlines started codeshare agreements with BMI, Brussels Airlines, Lufthansa and TAP Air Portugal. On 26 May 2009, the Aegean Airlines' membership application was approved by the Chief Executive Board of Star Alliance. Aegean joined the alliance on 30 June 2010.

In February 2010, initial shareholder discussions took place to consider co-operation between Aegean Airlines and Olympic Air fueling rumours of a possible merger. On 22 February 2010, Olympic Air and Aegean Airlines announced that they agreed to a merger. The newly merged airline was to carry the Olympic brand name and logo, after a transition period in which both airline brands would be used in parallel. The Aegean brand would cease to exist after the transition period. It was expected that the merger would be finalised and the combined airline would begin operation by October 2010.

Aegean joined Star Alliance at the end of June 2010. The intent was for the merged carrier to be a Star Alliance member, despite the fact that Olympic Air was forging ties with SkyTeam pre-merger. Star Alliance welcomed the proposed merger, releasing a statement stating "The integration teams from both sides will soon meet to assess the necessary steps, in order to guarantee a smooth transition of the merged Aegean Airlines and Olympic Air operations into the Star Alliance network".

On 26 January 2011, the European Commission blocked the merger between the two airlines, citing anti-competition concerns. The commission stated that the merger would have created a "quasi-monopoly" in Greece's air transport market, with the combined airline controlling more than 90% of the Greek domestic air transport market. The EC further stated its belief that the merger would lead to higher fares for four of the six million Greek and European passengers flying to and from Athens each year, with no realistic prospects that a new airline of sufficient size would enter the market to restrain the merged airline's pricing. Additionally, commissioner Joaquin Almunia stated that the merger would have led to higher prices and lower quality of service for Greeks and tourists traveling between Athens and the islands. Both carriers offered remedies in an attempt to ease concerns, though the EU believed that they would not be enough to protect travelers adequately and ease competition concerns. One of the remedies offered by the airlines included ceding takeoff and landing slots at Greek airports, though the commission noted that Greek airports do not suffer from the congestion observed at other European airports in previous airline mergers or alliances.

On 21 October 2012 Aegean Airlines announced that it had struck a deal to acquire Olympic Air, pending approval by the European Commission. On 23 April 2013, the European Commission issued a press release announcing it was starting an in-depth investigation into the proposed acquisition of Olympic Air by Aegean Airlines and announcing that the Commission will have decided by 3 September 2013. On 13 August 2013 it was published in the Greek media that the final decision had been delayed until 16 October 2013. The merger was approved by the European Commission on 9 October 2013 citing that "due to the on-going Greek crisis and given Olympic's own very difficult financial situation, Olympic would be forced to leave the market soon in any event".

On 1 February 2014 Aegean Airlines took over every non-Public Service Obligation route that was previously operated by Olympic Air.

Corporate affairs

Ownership
 the airline is owned by Theodoros Vassilakis (34.17% - 23.6% via Evertrans S.A. and 9.46% via Autοhellas S.A.), Alnesco Enterprises Company Limited (9.48%), Siana Enterprises Company Limited (9.48%), Konstantakopoulos Achilleas (6.39%).

Business trends
In 2009, Aegean Airlines carried 6.6 million passengers surpassing its then-rival Olympic Airlines (5.2 million passengers) for the first time. Losses were incurred 2010–2012, amidst the economic crisis for Greek tourism and the economy in general; passengers carried fell to 6.1 million, although the load factor increased to 74.3%. The group returned to profit in 2013, with further growth from 2014 with the takeover of Olympic Airways operations.

Recent business trends for the group are shown below (for year ending 31 December; figures from 2014 onward include Olympic Airways):

Destinations

Codeshare agreements
Aegean Airlines codeshares with the following airlines:

 airBaltic
 Air Canada
 Air Serbia
 Brussels Airlines
 Bulgaria Air
 EgyptAir
 Emirates
 Ethiopian Airlines
 Etihad Airways
 Hainan Airlines
 LOT Polish Airlines
 Lufthansa
 Oman Air
 Scandinavian Airlines
 S7 Airlines
 Singapore Airlines
 Swiss International Air Lines
 TAP Air Portugal
 TAROM
 Turkish Airlines
 Volotea

Additionally, Aegean Airlines has a commercial agreement with Trenitalia.

Charter flights
During the summer season, Aegean Airlines operates several A320s, performing charter services in association with major tour operators. The charter flights connect popular holiday destinations in Greece to Italy, France, United Kingdom, Poland, Israel, Romania, Russia, Sweden, Denmark, Estonia, Finland, Norway, Slovenia, Austria, Germany, Hungary, Ukraine and other countries. In recent years, they have also operated charter flights for football fixtures, for example, when the Greece national football team is playing abroad.

Aegean Airlines also owns a 51% stake in Animawings, a Romanian charter airline.

Fleet

Current fleet
, Aegean Airlines operates an all-Airbus fleet, consisting of the following aircraft:

In addition to the aircraft above, Aegean Airlines also operates a Learjet 60. The aircraft is used for the provision of VIP services and executive travel, in a non-scheduled flight basis.

Fleet development
In its history, the airline has so far made two strategic moves concerning its fleet. The first was meant to withdraw all turboprop planes from the fleet, which was accomplished in May 2004. In December 2005, the carrier placed an order for eight Airbus A320s.

In August 2010, Aegean Airlines became the first airline to commit to upgrading its Airbus A320 family fleet with the FANS-B+ datalink system offered by Airbus. By March 2014, passenger cabins across the entire fleet were retrofitted with brand-new reclining Aviointeriors Columbus Two seats, which are thinner and lighter, allowing the addition of an extra row. In 2014, Aegean Airlines also completed the purchase of seven brand-new Airbus A320ceo (current engine option) aircraft to add to its fleet; all deliveries were completed by early 2016.

In June 2018, Aegean firmed up a purchase agreement with Airbus for 10 A321neos and 20 A320neos, following a memorandum of understanding signed in March that year. The company also intended to lease up to 20 more Airbus aircraft.

Historical fleet
In addition to its current aircraft, Aegean Airlines previously operated the following types:

 ATR 72-200
 ATR 72-500 (wet-leased from SwiftAir)
 Boeing 737-300
 Boeing 737-400
 British Aerospace Avro RJ100

Livery
The Aegean Airlines livery is mostly "Eurowhite", featuring a thin red line towards the lower part of the fuselage. Above it, the fuselage is white and features the airline's name, written in dark blue using trademarked font series. Below the red line, the fuselage is painted grey. The Aegean Airlines logo, two seagulls flying in front of the sun, is featured on the tail of the aircraft. In addition to the standard livery, Aegean Airlines uses several non-standard liveries, such as one advertising Star Alliance as well as one celebrating the new Acropolis Museum.

Services

Frequent-flyer program
Miles+Bonus is the frequent flyer program of Aegean Airlines and its Olympic Air subsidiary. It is a rebranding of Miles&Bonus, the former frequent flyer program of Aegean as well as a replacement for Olympic Air's Travelair Club. Miles+Bonus has three tiers: Blue, Silver and Gold.

Airport lounges
Gold members of Miles+Bonus, or those with Gold status in another Star Alliance airline, as well as passengers traveling on business class on an Aegean Airlines or other Star Alliance flight, all have access to the three Aegean Business Lounges in Athens, Thessaloniki and Larnaca.

References

External links

Companies listed on the Athens Exchange
Companies based in Athens
Airlines for Europe
Association of European Airlines
Airlines of Greece
European Regions Airline Association
Airlines established in 1987
Greek brands
Star Alliance
Greek companies established in 1987